Ingrida Ardišauskaitė (born 17 January 1993 in Utena, Lithuania) is a retired Lithuanian cross-country skier.

She competed at FIS Nordic World Ski Championships 2011 and FIS Nordic World Ski Championships 2013.

In 2014 Ardišauskaitė was selected to represent Lithuania in 2014 Winter Olympic Games. In August 2014 Ardišauskaitė officially announced about her retirement from skiing.

References

External links
 
 
 
 
 

1993 births
Living people
Lithuanian female cross-country skiers
Olympic cross-country skiers of Lithuania
Cross-country skiers at the 2014 Winter Olympics
People from Utena